Vasiliy Dmitryevich Sokov (born 7 April 1968 in Dushanbe, Tajik SSR) is a triple jumper who represented the USSR and later Russia.

He is best known for his two bronze medals at the European Indoor Championships. His personal best was 17.59 metres, achieved in June 1993 in Moscow. His wife, Mariya Sokova, is also an athlete. Sokov represented Uzbekistan at the 2001 World Championships in Athletics.

Anti-doping rule violation 
Sokov received a three months doping ban for the use of ephedrine in 1995.

He has continued to jump, winning the bronze medal in a Russian sweep of the M45 division at the 2015 World Masters Athletics Championships.  His wife did one place better in the W40 division.

International competitions

See also
List of doping cases in athletics

References

sports-reference

1968 births
Living people
Sportspeople from Dushanbe
Soviet male triple jumpers
Russian male long jumpers
Russian male triple jumpers
Uzbekistani male triple jumpers
Olympic male triple jumpers
Olympic athletes of the Unified Team
Olympic athletes of Russia
Athletes (track and field) at the 1992 Summer Olympics
Athletes (track and field) at the 1996 Summer Olympics
World Athletics Championships athletes for the Soviet Union
World Athletics Championships athletes for Russia
World Athletics Championships athletes for Uzbekistan
Russian Athletics Championships winners
Doping cases in athletics
Russian sportspeople in doping cases
Tajikistani sportspeople in doping cases
Soviet sportspeople in doping cases
Tajikistani people of Russian descent
Uzbekistani people of Russian descent